Zangbalun is a community and also and electoral area within Kumbungu District in the northern region of Ghana.

References

Populated places in Kumbungu District